Sainiana Tukana (born 25 May 1962) is a Fijian hurdler. She competed in the women's 100 metres hurdles at the 1988 Summer Olympics.

References

External links

1962 births
Living people
Athletes (track and field) at the 1988 Summer Olympics
Fijian female hurdlers
Fijian heptathletes
Olympic athletes of Fiji
Place of birth missing (living people)